Jacques Mering (3 January 1904 – 29 March 1973) was a Lithuanian-born, naturalised French engineer well known in the fields of X-ray crystallography and mineralogy. He earned the degree of Diploma in Electrical Engineering (Diplôme d'Ingénieur en Génie Electrique) from École Spéciale des Travaux Publics, and Bachelor of Science (Licencié de Sciences) from Faculté des sciences. He served in the French Army for a year during 1931–1932 following conscription. He was director of research at the Centre National de Recherche Scientifique (CNRS; the French National Centre for Scientific Research) in Paris, and subsequently Director of CNRS Laboratory in Orléans.

Perhaps, Mering is best remembered for his inspiration and influence on the British chemist Rosalind Franklin, whom he trained in X-ray crystallography. Franklin's X-ray crystallographic image, popularised as Photo 51, became the single piece of clue for the discovery of the double-stranded helical structure of DNA by James Watson and Francis Crick in 1953.

Biography 

Mering was born to a Litvak family in Vilkaviškis, Lithuania, then within the Russian Empire. After formal education in Russia, he went to France in 1921 to study engineering. In 1925 he obtained the degree of Diplôme d'Ingénieur en Génie Electrique from École Spéciale des Travaux Publics in Paris. He joined the Faculté des sciences in Paris as research engineer in 1925, and at the same time enrolled in the institute for the course of Licencié de Sciences. He graduated in 1928. He continued to work as research engineer till 1931. In the late 1920s he trained for X-ray crystallography under Marcel Mathieu (who was trained in 1925–1926 under the Nobel laureate crystallographer William Henry Bragg at the Royal Institution in London). In 1930 he became a naturalised French citizen. Around 1931–1932 he was drafted to military service in the French Army. After conscription he joined Laboratoire Central des Services Chimique de l'Etat (now Institut National de Recherche Chimique Appliquée), first in Montpellier, then Grenoble (now under Joseph Fourier University), and finally in Paris. At Grenoble he carried out his research as a refugee during World War II, and he set up the first X-ray laboratory there. He returned to Paris after the war in 1945. In 1959 he became director of research at the Centre National de Recherche Scientifique (CNRS). In 1969 director of CNRS Laboratory for Research on Imperfect Crystalline Solids in Orléans, where he worked until his death.

Mering died on 29 March 1973 after several months of severe illness.

Contributions 

Mering published over 100 technical papers on X-ray and electron diffraction of clays and related layer silicates, and of carbon, graphite, and the phenomena involved in graphitisation. He also performed numerous experimental works on fine-grained materials, including crystal growth in gels, the crystalline organization in cellulose, the 'decoration' of kaolinite crystals with colloidal gold particles, clays as catalysts, montmorillonites, hectorite, and clay-organic complexes.

Personal life 

Mering was known a strictly principled individual when it comes to academic ethics. He never claimed for co-authorship in publications of theses of his own students. (It was a tradition in France at the time.) Moreover, he never published with more than three co-authors, (one of them would be an external collaborator if there are three) although his laboratory was always in full capacity in terms of researchers. His work ethic was noted for its demanding efforts, but during breaks he maintained absolute liberty. Researchers were encourages to make friends with each other, share their meals, make coffee, go for outings, and discuss about their scientific work, politics, and social issues. In his private life, Mering had his own frivolity. Although he was separated from his wife, he never divorced her, while he charmed a mistress and other girls. He was described as "a deliberate charmer with whom all the young women were in love".

Honours and recognitions 

Mering was the founder member and President (1956–1958) of Groupe Français des Argiles and was president. He was president of the Groupe Français d'Etude des Carbones, and of the Association Française de Cristallographie. At the time of his death, he was Vice-Président of the Société Française de Minéralogie et Cristallographie. He was also elected member of the Clay Minerals Society of USA. A technical book titled X-Ray Diffraction by Disordered Lamellar Structures was published in 1990 by his former students and collaborators in a tribute to his works.

References 

1904 births
1973 deaths
People from Vilkaviškis
Naturalized citizens of France
20th-century French engineers
Crystallographers
French Army personnel
French refugees
World War II refugees
Lithuanian emigrants to France
Research directors of the French National Centre for Scientific Research